Panneerselvam Iniyan (born 13 September 2002) is an Indian chess professional player. He is India's 61st player to be awarded the title of Grandmaster by FIDE.

He achieved the first GM norm in June 2017 at the "Ciutat de Montcada" open, the second in February 2018 at the Böblingen open, the third in July 2018 at the Barberà del Vallès open.

Other results were a 4th place at the Andorra open in 2017; 2nd after Richard Rapport in the Coppa Vergani at Villorba (Italy) in January 2018.

In April 2019, he placed equal 1st-8th at the Dubai Open with 7/9 (Maxim Matlakov won the event on tiebreak).

In July 2019, he won the Commonwealth Championship U18 at New Delhi with 7/7; in the same month, he was second at the Thailand Chess Festival of Pattaya.

References

External links
 
 P. Iniyan player profile and games at 365Chess.com

Indian chess players
Chess grandmasters
2002 births
Living people